Kriss Hyseni (born 21 February 1998) is a French-born Albanian footballer who most recently played as a forward for Laçi in the Albanian Superliga.

References

External links
 

1998 births
Living people
Albanian footballers
Association football forwards
Albanian expatriate footballers
Albanian expatriate sportspeople in France
Expatriate footballers in France
French expatriate sportspeople in Albania
Expatriate footballers in Albania
Kategoria Superiore players
KF Laçi players